Rodolfo Franklin Sr. (born September 28, 1967), known professionally as Clark Kent or DJ Clark Kent, is an American hip hop record producer, DJ and music executive of Panamanian descent. His crew of DJs is called "The Supermen", and his DJ moniker is derived from the name of Superman's alter ego.

Music career 
In the late 1980s, DJ Clark Kent was rapper Dana Dane's DJ. Around this time, Kent would DJ at clubs such as one just around the block from Downtown Records on West 26th Street in Manhattan which was a short-lived hip-hop hotbed with other DJs also performing there, such as Funkmaster Flex and Kid Capri. In 1989, he produced the remix for Troop's hit song "Spread My Wings."

He later scored his first street hit with the Junior M.A.F.I.A. song "Player's Anthem" which featured The Notorious B.I.G. and was also the first record that Lil' Kim appeared on. The biggest hit he produced was "Loverboy" by Mariah Carey, which peaked at #2 in the US on Billboard's Hot 100 chart. He has produced tracks for artists such as Lil' Kim, The Notorious B.I.G., Mad Skillz, Estelle, Lil' Vicious, Mona Lisa, 50 Cent, Canibus, Slick Rick and Rakim, as well as groups like The Future Sound and Original Flavor, which were signed to East West Records and Atlantic Records respectively. Both groups were signed by Clark, who was a director of A&R at Atlantic at the time.

Around the early 1990s, DJ Clark Kent took over the job of MC for the then-titled New Music Seminar, a battle between the best DJs in hip hop. Renaming it "Clark Kent's Superman Battle for World Supremacy", he would go on to host the event for a number of years. One of the most famous battles in this arena was the legendary match between DJ Noize and DJ 8-Ball, which resulted in a landslide victory for DJ Noize and DJ 8-Ball's subsequent humiliation. After the last set, he is heard telling the crowd "I don't need to even TELL you all who won!"

Damon Dash, one time manager of The Future Sound and Original Flavor, has credited DJ Clark Kent with introducing him to Jay-Z. Original Flavor featured the then little known rapper on their single "Can I Get Open" in 1994. This would lead to the 1995 start of Roc-A-Fella Records, and further collaborations between Clark and Jay-Z, who met when they were teenagers, as Clark would go on to produce three tracks on Jay-Z's critically acclaimed debut album, Reasonable Doubt. The tracks were: "Brooklyn's Finest", which features The Notorious B.I.G.,"Coming of Age", which features Memphis Bleek, and "Cashmere Thoughts", which contains a conversation between Clark and Jay-Z. Clark stated that he introduced B.I.G. and Jay-Z at the studio session for their collaboration. During this time, Clark would also introduce his cousin Foxy Brown to Jay-Z, and the two would team up on the hit single "Ain't No Nigga". On 2003's The Black Album, billed as his "retirement" project, Jay-Z alludes to Clark's role in helping him break into the industry, on the album's last song (titled "My 1st Song"). He states: "Clark Kent, that was good lookin' out, nigga."

Clark discovered rapper Shyne, whom he accidentally overheard rhyming in a barbershop, in 1998. Noting the young MC's vocal similarity to The Notorious B.I.G., Clark steered him towards Bad Boy Records and Sean "Puff Daddy" Combs signed him.

Other ventures 
Aside from his work in music, Clark is "an addict for sneakers" and once claimed to own 3,500 pairs of footwear. In 2010, Nike commissioned him to design and unveil a "Nike Five Boroughs AF1 Low" pack of special limited edition Nike Air Force 1 shoes. He has also collaborated with other popular brands, such as Adidas and New Balance.

References

External links
 Discogs entry
 Five Boroughs Pack Air Force 1 
 

American hip hop record producers
American hip hop DJs
African-American DJs
Panamanian emigrants to the United States
Living people
1960s births
American hip hop musicians
21st-century African-American people
20th-century African-American people